Tône is a prefecture located in the Savanes Region of Togo. The prefecture seat is located in Dapaong. The cantons (or subdivisions) of Tône include Dapaong ; − Kantindi, Bidjenga, Tami, Lotogou, Warkambou, Nanergou, Nioukpourma, Pana, Naki-Ouest, Korbongou, Kourientré, Namaré, Louanga, Toaga, Poissongui, Sanfatoute, Natigou.

References 

Prefectures of Togo
Savanes Region, Togo